"Like Sister and Brother" is a song written and originally recorded by The Drifters in 1973. It was the first of four charting singles released from their Love Games LP. Bill Fredericks is the lead singer.

The song reached the Top 10 in the UK, the first of three to do so.  "Like Sister and Brother" also reached the Top 10 in Australia.

Chart history

Weekly charts

Year-end charts

References

External links
 

1973 songs
1973 singles
The Drifters songs
Bell Records singles
Songs written by Roger Cook (songwriter)
Songs written by Roger Greenaway